Man of Action may refer to:

Film and television
The Man of Action, a 1919 German silent film
A Man of Action (1923 film), an American silent comedy film
A Man of Action (2022 film), a crime drama film
Man of Action (film), an American film of 1933
"A Man of Action" (Dad's Army), an episode of Dad's Army
Man of Action Entertainment, an American film, television, and comics writer collective

Music
"Man of Action", a song by the Matthew Good Band from The Audio of Being, 2001
"Man of Action", a song by Utopia from POV, 1985
"Man of Action", a song composed by Les Reed, the theme tune for Radio North Sea International 1970–1974

See also 
 Action Man (disambiguation)
 Men of Action, a 1935 American film